The National Political Union (Ethniki Politiki Enosis (EPEN)) was a far-right political party in Greece. The party was founded on January 30, 1984 by jailed former junta leader Georgios Papadopoulos. It participated (unsuccessfully) in the 1985 general election. In the 1984 elections to the European Parliament, the party polled 2.3% of the vote, giving it one of the 24 seats held by Greece.

Members of EPEN
Well-known members of EPEN were:
Georgios Papadopoulos
Makis Voridis
Nikolaos Michaloliakos
Chrysanthos Dimitriadis
Spyros Zournatzis

Electoral results

See also
 National Political Union (1946)

References

Political parties established in 1984
Defunct nationalist parties in Greece
Anti-communist parties
Fascism in Greece
Neo-fascist parties
Metaxist parties